Hockey Club Yugra, is a professional ice hockey team based in Khanty-Mansiysk, Yugra, Russia. They currently play in the Supreme Hockey League, the second-highest league in Russia, and played in the Kontinental Hockey League from 2010 until 2018.

History
After their first club season, Yugra was granted professional status and moved from the Vtoraya Liga into the Pervaya Liga. Their stay in the third level also lasted just one season, as Yugra won the championship for 2007-08. Another promotion followed, to the Russia's second-tier Russian Major League, where they won the league's championship in both seasons played. In 2010, Yugra was granted admission in the Kontinental Hockey League.

On March 28, 2018, KHL announced that two teams were going to drop out from the league, Yugra was one of the teams announced along with HC Lada Togliatti, Yugra was to compete in the second tiered VHL.

Honors

Champions
 Vysshaya Liga (3): 2009, 2010, 2021
 Pervaya Liga (1): 2008

Season-by-season KHL record

Note: GP = Games played, W = Wins, OTW = Overtime/shootout wins, OTL = Overtime/shootout losses, L = Losses, Pts = Points, GF = Goals for, GA = Goals against

References

External links
Official site of HC Yugra 

 
Ice hockey teams in Russia
Former Kontinental Hockey League teams
Sport in Khanty-Mansiysk
Ice hockey clubs established in 2006
2006 establishments in Russia